Splendrillia disjecta is a species of sea snail, a marine gastropod mollusk in the family Drilliidae.

Description
The length of the shell attains 7½ mm, its diameter 2½ mm.

Distribution
This marine species occurs in the Persian Gulf, the Gulf of Oman and off Fiji

References

 Smith, E.A. (1888) Diagnoses of new species of Pleurotomidae in the British Museum. Annals and Magazine of Natural History, series 6, 2, p. 308

External links
 Melvill & Standen (1901) Mollusks from the Persian Gulf and Arabian Sea; Proceedings of the Zoological Society of London.  v. 2, 1901
  Tucker, J.K. 2004 Catalog of recent and fossil turrids (Mollusca: Gastropoda). Zootaxa 682:1–1295.

disjecta
Gastropods described in 1888